Soungalo Bagayogo (15 June 1941 – 11 May 2012) was a Malian boxer. He competed in the men's light heavyweight event at the 1968 Summer Olympics. In December 2011, he was designated by Mali's National Olympic Committee as a stakeholder in the development of sport in his home country.

References

External links
 

1941 births
2012 deaths
Malian male boxers
Olympic boxers of Mali
Boxers at the 1968 Summer Olympics
Place of birth missing
Light-heavyweight boxers
21st-century Malian people